Andrey Dashkov (born Andrey Georgievich Dashkov, ; 28 January 1965) is a contemporary horror fiction writer which resides in Kharkiv, Ukraine, and writes in Russian. Genre of Dashkov's first novels may be defined as dark fantasy. His last novels and short stories usually carry the outward conventions of the horror fiction genre, but include elements of dystopia and mysticism.

Andrey Dashkov bio
Andrey Georgievich Dashkov (Андрей Георгиевич Дашков) was born 28 January 1965, in Kharkiv, Soviet Ukraine. He graduated from Kharkiv Aviation Institute (1988). After the service in the Soviet Armed Forces (1988–1990) he worked at a research institute. Dashkov published his first dark fantasy novel The Apostate in 1993, thus beginning his career as a professional writer. Since 2006 he is engaged exclusively in the literature.

Bibliography

Novels
 1993 The Apostate
 1994 Hell Star
 1995 Viperling
 1996 The Disfigured
 1996 The Deceived
 1996 The Servant of Werewolves
 1996 Die Or Disappear!
 1997 Necromancers Wars
 1997 Paranoia Doors
 1998 The Pale Horseman, Black Jack
 1999 Lost Light
 2000 Hurricane Eye
 2001 The Collector of Bones
 2001 Superanimal
 2003 The Dragon
 2010 Lazarus, or Journey of Destined To Die (Russian: "Лазарь, или Путешествие смертника")(audiobook)
 2011 Figment of imagination (Russian: "Плод воображения")
 2012 Midnight Sun. New Era (Russian: "Солнце полуночи. Новая эра")
 2012 Wandering Of Senor (Russian: "Странствие Сенора")

External links
 Andrey Dashkov Official Website.
 Andrey Dashkov books from Amazon.
 Andrey Dashkov fan club (Russian).

1965 births
Living people
Russian fantasy writers
Writers from Kharkiv